No. 85 Squadron was a squadron of the Royal Air Force.  It last served in 2011, as No. 85 (Reserve) Squadron posted to RAF Church Fenton.

History

In World War I
No. 85 Squadron was formed at Upavon on 1 August 1917; the station was home to the Royal Flying Corps Central Flying School.  Shortly afterwards, the squadron moved to Mousehold Heath near Norwich under the command of Major R A Archer. During November 1917 the squadron transferred to Hounslow Heath Aerodrome, and in March 1918 Major William Avery Bishop VC, DSO, MC, took command and carried out his orders to prepare and train for front line duties in France.  On 1 April 1918 No. 85 Squadron was transferred into the newly formed Royal Air Force.  Following this period of training the squadron deployed to France during May 1918. Equipped with the Sopwith Dolphin and later the Royal Aircraft Factory S.E.5A, it flew fighter patrols and ground attack sorties over the Western Front until the Armistice was signed.

On 21 June 1918, there was a change of command and training methods following the arrival of the new CO, Major Edward "Mick" Mannock DSO, MC. Rather than fight as individuals, the squadron was taught to act as a unit during combat.  During a patrol on 26 July 1918, accompanying Lt DC Inglis over the front line, Major Mannock failed to return, depriving 85 Squadron of its leader.  On 18 July 1919, Major Mannock was awarded a posthumous VC. No. 85 Squadron amassed 99 victories during its short involvement in the conflict. Besides Bishop and Mannock, the squadron had other notable aces, such as Malcolm C. McGregor, Arthur Randall, John Warner, Alec Reid, Spencer B. Horn, Walter H. Longton and Lawrence Callahan. 85 Squadron returned to the UK in February 1919. The squadron disbanded on 3 July 1919.

The Squadron became notorious after it rejected the ace James McCudden as commanding officer, on the grounds of snobbery.

World War II

On 1 June 1938, the squadron was reformed from the renumbered elements of "A" Flight of No. 87 Squadron RAF and placed under the command of Flight Lieutenant D. E. Turner.  The squadron was posted to RAF Debden in Essex and commenced training on the Gloster Gladiator (the RAF's last biplane fighter).  On 4 September the first Hawker Hurricanes began arriving in numbers. With war looking likely in Europe, No. 85 Squadron received the signal ordering its immediate mobilisation on 23 August 1939, the aircraft making up both "A" and "B" Flights were kept at a state of constant readiness and by 1 September the squadron had completed its preparation for the impending move to France.

On the outbreak of the Second World War, the squadron moved its 16 Hurricanes to Boos as part of the Air Component of the British Expeditionary Force (BEF) 60 Fighter Wing.  Their primary role was to give support to the Fairey Battle and Bristol Blenheim units deployed around Rheims and to provide vital air defence cover for their airfields.  Initial sorties involved patrols over the English Channel and a move to Merville was instigated in late September. By 1 November 1939, another move saw the squadron posted to Lille Seclin and to maintain its patrols over the Channel, sections were detached to Le Touquet and Saint-Inglevert.  During one such patrol over the Boulogne area, the squadron scored its first victory of the war, when Flight Lieutenant R. H. A. Lee attacked a Heinkel He 111 which crashed into the Channel, exploding on impact.

December 1939 saw a Royal visit from his Majesty the King accompanied by the Duke of Gloucester and Viscount Lord Gort.  The onset of winter proved to be an additional challenge as bitterly cold weather prevented flying, caused damage to aircraft and took its toll on the health of the airmen, who were living in fairly primitive conditions.  When the German invasion (Blitzkrieg) commenced in May 1940, No 85 Squadron found itself locked in a bitter contest with the Luftwaffe, and with attacks on its aerodromes commonplace there was no respite from operations.

In an eleven-day period the squadron accounted for a confirmed total of 90 enemy aircraft; there were many more claims that could not be substantiated.  The final sorties saw the squadron giving fighter cover to the Allied armies until its airfields were overrun and the three remaining aircraft returned to the UK.  During the intense battles over France, the squadron lost seventeen pilots; two killed, six wounded and nine missing, this figure included their new CO Squadron Leader Peacock but had once again had acquitted itself well in the face of many adversities.

The squadron re-equipped and resumed full operations early in June 1940.  After taking part in the first half of the Battle of Britain over southern England, the squadron moved to Yorkshire in September and in October following a change in role commenced night fighter patrols.  For the remainder of the Second World War No. 85 Squadron continued its nocturnal pursuit of intercepting enemy raiders. It had a brief period providing Bomber Support as part of No. 100 Group RAF and even took part in the famous anti-diver patrols intercepting V1 flying bombs.

Entering the jet age
Following the end of war in Europe, 85 Squadron remained active as a night-fighter unit, and flying operations continued into the jet age with new aircraft types such as the NF 11 and NF 14 Gloster Meteor, Gloster Javelin and English Electric Canberra. In its final reformation on 19 December 1975, No. 85 Squadron was a Bristol Bloodhound Mark II surface-to-air missile unit. It was operational at several RAF stations in the United Kingdom with headquarters at RAF West Raynham in Norfolk. The squadron continued to play a significant part in Air Defence operations as part of 11 Group RAF Strike Command until the 1990s. The collapse of the Warsaw Pact and the end of the Cold War period heralded wide sweeping changes in the United Kingdom's Air Defence needs. No. 85 Squadron was disbanded on 31 July 1991 and the Standard bearing the squadron's battle honours was interred and is in the safekeeping of Ely Cathedral. At the end the flights of No. 85 were based at the following airfields:

 No. 85 Squadron at RAF West Raynham
 A Flight at RAF West Raynham
 B Flight at RAF North Coates
 C Flight at RAF Bawdsey
 D Flight at RAF Barkston Heath*
 E Flight at RAF Wattisham*
 F Flight at RAF Wyton*

* Joined the squadron after No. 25 Squadron converted to Tornado F3 on 1 August 1989.

2017 marked the 100th Anniversary of No. 85 Squadron, its Association met in June to celebrate the rich history gained throughout the many years of service to the Nation and the Crown. No. 85 Squadron reformed as No 85 (Reserve) Squadron in 2008, located at RAF Church Fenton, teaching Elementary Flying Training in the Grob Tutor. In August 2011, the squadron was disbanded due to the reductions in the RAF and Fleet Air Arm following the 2010 Strategic Defence and Security Review.

Commanding officers

See also
List of Royal Air Force aircraft squadrons

References

Notes

Bibliography

 Franks, Norman, et al. American Aces of World War I. Osprey Publishing, 2001. , .
 Halley, James J. The Squadrons of the Royal Air Force & Commonwealth, 1918–1988. Tonbridge, Kent, UK: Air-Britain (Historians) Ltd., 1988. .
 Jefford, C.G. RAF Squadrons, a Comprehensive Record of the Movement and Equipment of all RAF Squadrons and their Antecedents since 1912. Shrewsbury, Shropshire, UK: Airlife Publishing, 2001. .
 Rawlings, John D.R. Fighter Squadrons of the RAF and their Aircraft. London: Macdonald and Jane's (Publishers) Ltd., 1969 (new edition 1976, reprinted 1978). .
 Robinson, Anthony. RAF Fighter Squadrons in the Battle of Britain. London: Arms and Armour Press Ltd., 1987 (Reprinted in 1999 by Brockhampton Press, .)

External links

 Royal Air Force – History of No. 85 Squadron
 No 81 – 85 Squadron Histories
 No. 85 squadron in art

085 Squadron
085 Squadron
Military units and formations established in 1917
1917 establishments in England